William, Willie, Bill or Billy Steel may refer to:

William Gladstone Steel (1854–1934), American conservationist considered by many to be the father of Crater Lake National Park
William Steel (golfer) (fl. 1860), Scottish golfer
William Arthur Steel (1890–1968), Canadian Army officer and radio pioneer
Willie Steel (1908–1990), Scottish footballer
Bill Steel (born 1939), British actor and television and radio broadcaster
Billy Steel (1923–1982), Scottish international footballer
Jim Steel (footballer) (William James Steel, born 1959), Scottish footballer

See also
William Steele (disambiguation)